Gharib Hajji (also Romanized as Gharīb Ḩājjī; also known as Gharīr Ḩājjī) is a village in Anjirlu Rural District, in the Central District of Bileh Savar County, Ardabil Province, Iran. At the 2006 census, its population was 119, in 24 families.

References 

Tageo

Towns and villages in Bileh Savar County